Odyssey Software was a computer game developer founded in 1987 in Eastham, Massachusetts by Art V. Cestaro III. The company produced games for the Amiga and the Nintendo Entertainment System (NES).

History
Odyssey's earliest titles were expanded works based on arcade games popular at that time. Byteman was based on Pac-Man, Jailbreak was based on Arkanoid, Deathbots was based on Berzerk, and Space War was based on Asteroids' as well as the original "Spacewar!" for the PDP-1'.

After its early attempts at working as an independent game developer Odyssey began taking contracts from other established companies. In 1990, Moon Ranger, was produced under contract with Color Dreams for the NES. Odyssey established a relationship with American Video Entertainment, who contracted Deathbots for the NES. After Deathbots, Odyssey went on to produce Solitaire and Blackjack, which American Video Entertainment subsequently published. Three other Nintendo titles (Backgammon, Cue Stick, and Poker) were in production but American Video Entertainment went out of business before any of these titles could be published.

Odyssey was involved early in the Mad Dog McCree project, doing video cleanup by hand, but were never contracted for the final development of this title.

Odyssey Software went out of business in 1995.

Notable employees
Odyssey's original employees were programmers George C. Rucker III, Lane Waters. and Scott Lahteine, and graphic artists Soren Young, Dave Flamburis, John Silano, and Ranjeet Singhal. Around 1990 Mike Smith and Steve Tilton joined the team to work on Moon Ranger. In 1993 Jerry Normandin joined Odyssey for the Mad Dog McCree project. Other employees of Odyssey include Mike Davis, Mark Kelly, Monty Eriksin, Dennis St. Aubin, and Tomisa Starr.

Games developed by Odyssey
 Byteman (1988)
 Deathbots (for Amiga) (1988)
 Jailbreak (1988)
 Space War (1988)
 Moon Ranger (1989)
 Deathbots (for NES) (1990)
 Solitaire (1991)
 Blackjack'' (1992)

External links
 History of the company
 Concerto Software employs George C. Rucker III
 Softgame was founded by Lane Waters
 Thinkyhead Software was founded by Scott Lahteine
 Jerry Normandin's home page
 Ritual Entertainment now employs Ranjeet Singhal as Director of Art & Animation
 Nascar Racing 2 was designed by Dave Flamburis working for Papyrus Design Group
 NESWorld Article about American Video Entertainment was contributed to by Art and Jerry
 MobyGames' entry on Tomisa Starr
 Dino Wars was created by Art Cestaro, Ranjeet and Scott before Odyssey was founded

Defunct video game companies of the United States